İbrahim Akın (born 4 January 1984) is a Turkish former professional footballer who played as a left winger. He is a part of the management of Altay.

Career
Akın started his career at Altay S.K. in the Türk Telekom League A before he was transferred to Beşiktaş in June 2004. After three seasons with Beşiktaş he was transferred to İstanbul BB where he scored 24 goals in 94 matches. Before the beginning of the 2012–13 season, he signed a contract with Gaziantepspor for three years.

Later career
On 14 August 2019, it was confirmed, that Akın had retired from football and would continue as a part of Altay's management, working alongside the club's sporting director, Özden Töraydın, as responsible for the foreign players of the club.

Involvement in match-fixing
In July 2011, Akın admitted to participating in match fixing, specifically relating to two matches: Istanbul BB's match against Fenerbahçe, and the Turkish Cup final against Beşiktaş. Following his arrest he withdrew his confession, claiming he had been tricked and his confession given under duress, and denied any involvement in the alleged corruption.

On 7 May 2012, the Turkish Football Federation gave a verdict for the people involved with the match-fixing case. The federation banned Akın for three years for allegedly fixing the result of a match when his team lost to Fenerbahçe 2–0 on 1 May 2011.

On 4 June 2012, the Arbitration Board of Turkish Football Federation reduced Akın's sentence from three years to two years.

Honours
Beşiktaş
Turkish Cup: 2005–06, 2006–07
Turkish Super Cup: 2006

References

External links
 
 
 

1984 births
Living people
Footballers from İzmir
Association football wingers
Turkish footballers
Altay S.K. footballers
Beşiktaş J.K. footballers
İstanbul Başakşehir F.K. players
Gaziantepspor footballers
Sivasspor footballers
Süper Lig players
TFF First League players
TFF Second League players
Turkey international footballers
Turkey under-21 international footballers
Turkey youth international footballers